The Hungary–Kosovo relations are foreign relations between Hungary and Kosovo. Kosovo declared its independence from Serbia on 17 February 2008 and Hungary recognised it on 19 March 2008. Hungary has an embassy in Pristina.

Military

Hungary currently has 353 troops serving in Kosovo as peacekeepers in the NATO-led Kosovo Force.

See also 
 Foreign relations of Hungary
 Foreign relations of Kosovo
 Hungary–Serbia relations

Notes

References

References:

 
Bilateral relations of Kosovo
Kosovo